Khangabok is a village located about 25 km south of Imphal, in the state of Manipur, India. Its jurisdiction falls under the Thoubal District Division. Khangabok is one of the largest villages in Manipur in terms of area and population.

The Meeteis are the primary ethnic group populating the village. The language spoken is Meetei (also known as Manipuri), which was included in Eighth Schedule of Indian Constitution in 1992.

History 
The name Khangabok is believed to have derived from the tree Khangra (scientific name Dipterocarpus turbinatus) which covered the present-day village area. As people started settling in the area, the trees were cut down, and the place got the name Khangrapokpi meaning where Khangra is grown. The modern derivation of Khangrapokpi is Khangabok.

The Department of Archaeology, Government of Manipur, carried out excavation at Khangabok with an objective of ascertaining the cultural sequence and study of the ethno-archaeological aspects of the site in the campus of Khangabok Maisnam Leikai Boys' Primary School. Many goods comprising beads, bronze rings and plates, bones, potsherds were recovered from burial graves. The excavation revealed only the secondary pot burials with fragments of skull and bone with one to three pots from each burial. In addition, pot of medium size covered with ring-footed bowls were also unearthed. At least four to six thin bronze plates were found with each burial, perhaps used in ceremonial offerings. Two square metal coins were also found which belonged to the reign of Maharaj Garibniwaz (1709–48 AD).

Demography

Population 
Khangabok village is home to around 3520 families. As of 2011 India census, the total population of Khangabok is 16344.  49.83% of the population (8144) is male. The population of children (0–6 years) is 2184 which makes up 13.36% of total population of the village. Average Sex Ratio of Khangabok village is 1007 which is higher than Manipur state average of 985. Child Sex Ratio of the village 919, lower than state average of 930.

Literacy 
The literacy rate of Khangabok village is 72.00% (compared to 76.94% of Manipur). The Male literacy stands at 82.50% while female literacy rate is 61.71%.

Religion 
Most of the people practice dual religion, namely Sanamahism and Hinduism. Lainingthou Ikop Ningthou is the Umanglai (village deity) of Khangabok for which the Lai Haraoba (pleasing of the village deity) is performed annually with traditional fervour in the month of Kalen (equivalent to May in English calendar).

Geography

Size and composition 
Total area of Khangabok is 20.47 square kilometer, making it as the largest village in Thoubal District. Khangabok lies between 24-55 North latitudes and 94-98 East longitudes. Khangabok, because of its large area, is divided into three zones (with 19 Leikais)

Part 1: (6 Leikais namely Shanirou, Sorok Wangma, Awang Leikai, Maning Leikai and part of Khullakpam Leikai, Awang Khunou),

Part 2: (5 Leikais namely Part of Khullakpam Leikai, Moirang Palli, Mayai Leikai, Loishang, and Maisnam Leikai) and

Part 3: (8 Leikais namely Tangkha Leikai, Lamlong, Naorem Leikai, Makha Leikai, Khunou, Leipat Leikai, Lamdaibung Leikai (Kha Khundon) and Cherapur).

Khangabok is bounded in the north-west by Athokpam village, in the north-east by Charangpat village, in the east by Hayel-Labuk village, in the south by Wangjing village and Tentha village, and in the west by Ikop Pat (Lake).

Climate 
The climate of Khangabok is largely influenced by the topography of the hilly region which defines the geography of Manipur. Like other places in Manipur, the village is blessed with a generally amiable climate though the winters can be a little chilly. In winter the mercury often falls near zero degree Celsius. The coldest month is January and July experience maximum temperature. The weather remains bright and sunny without the scorch of the sun during the period from October to March. The village is also drenched in rains from the month of May and continues till the middle of October. The downpour ranges from light drizzles to heavy showers. The normal rainfall enriches the soil and helps in agricultural activities and irrigation.

Vegetation 
Khangabok represents the features of flat plain topography. The soil is of the type alluvium and contains small rock fragments, sand and sandy clay. The vegetation consists of a large variety of plants ranging from short and tall grasses, reeds and bamboos to trees of various species. Arundo Donax (yengtou), Leihao, Bamboo, Cane, Eucalyptus etc. are some of the important floras growing in plenty.

Drainage system 
There are four rivers that run through Khangabok and they are named as Karak River, Arong River, Shagonkong (also known as Hogaibi) River and Nongdambi River. The Ikop Pat, which is situated in the western side of Khangabok, is one of the largest lakes in Manipur.

Transport and communication 
The National Highway (India) No. 102 (earlier called as National Highway No. 39)  which connects Numaligarh, Assam to the end of Indo-Myanmar Border town Moreh runs through Khangabok. This road is included in AH1, longest route of the Asian Highway Network. Other important intra-village roads connecting various places of village are: Khullak Road, Mamang Road, Sorok Wangma Road, Moirang Palli Road and Makha Road.

Economy 
The main economy comes from agriculture. Agricultural products include rice, maize, vegetables and fruits. Khangabok is famous for handicrafts and some of these native exotic handicrafts include bamboo baskets (thumuk) and harvesting mats (yenna phak) made from Giant Cane also known as Arundo Donax (yengtou). Khangabok is famed throughout Manipur for Tule, (Schoenoplectus acutus) know locally as Kouna, based handicrafts too. Kouna is used for making seating mat (phak), stool (mora), chair, mattress and various other crafts. 

The only sugar factory of Manipur is located at Khangabok. However, the factory is no longer operational and instead an outpost for the 3rd Indian Reserved Battalion (IRB) has been set up inside the premise. Other economy comes from fishery, trade, hand-loom products etc.

Education 
Khangabok has become a major educational hub in Manipur for pre-college education, thanks to the many prominent schools being established in the village. Some of the schools in Khangabok are:

Higher secondary schools 
The K.M. Blooming Higher Secondary School
The New Public Higher Secondary School
The Eastern Star Higher Secondary School
The Khangabok Higher Secondary School

High schools 
The P.M Unique Academy
Amuba High School
Gulap Memorial English School
Wisdom Foundation 
Yanaki Peace Academy
BASE Academy

Primary schools 
Khangabok Maisnam Leikai Boys' Primary School
Khangabok Mayai Leikai Primary School
Primary School Khangabok Part I (also known as School Angangbi)
Khangabok Awang Leikai Primary School
Khangabok Makha Primary School
K.S. Learning Temple, Khangabok Makha Leikai

Government Institutions 
Khangabok houses many government institutions such as:
District Hospital Management Society
District Leprosy Hospital
Telephone Exchange BSNL
District Fishery Research Centre
District Superintendent of Police Headquarters
District & Sessions Court
Sugar Factory. It is Manipur's first and only sugar factory but not functional anymore.
District Rice Research Center
District Sericulture Research Center
Food Corporation of India
Krishi Vigyan Kendra

Past & Present MLAs 
Late Thokchom Achouba Singh 
Okram Ibobi Singh
Laishram Jatra Singh
Okram Landhoni Devi
Okram Surjakumar (present)

Important places

Ikop Pat 

The lake is situated in western part of Khangabok, at a distance of about 28 km in the south-eastern direction of Imphal and is located at an altitude of 772 m above MSL is 7.5 km in length and 1.8 km in breadth during the rainy season. The surface area Measures 13.5 km2 while the depths in the different areas range between 0.93 and 1.59 m. The depths have become much shallower currently. The Lake is physiographically characterized by a saucer shaped basin with gentle slope and a much silted bottom. Physico-chemical analysis of the water samples from the lake reveal highly polluted condition. There occurs rise in the water temperature while the turbidity rate also stands high. The water in many areas is found to be highly acidic (pH-3.6) while in other areas high alkalinity (pH-9.3) has been noticed. Observation of high concentration of dissolved carbon dioxide coupled with lower values of dissolved oxygen in different seasons reveal the deteriorating quality of water.

The Ikop Lake is currently under great human pressure due to heavy encroachments due to the development of farms by a number of fishing co-operative societies.

Ikop Pat is the site where Khamba caught the wild ox of the Khamba-Thoibi legend.

Lamlong Keithel (Bazar) 
This is one of the business markets in Khangabok situated at the junction of Khullakpam Lambi, Makha Lambi and Mamang Lambi.

Shri Shri Bangsibudon Temple 
In 1798, the king of Manipur Bhagyachandra was given an instruction in his dream by Lord Krishna. Accordingly, idol of Shri Abdeita was carved out of a jack-fruit tree and the idol was erected at Lamangdong. Two more idols were sculpted out of the jack fruit tree. One was named Bangshibadan, and was given to a royal attendant who resided at Khangabok. The other idol was Gourarai Prabhu in Sega road. People from various places of Manipur come to Bangshibadan Temple for worshipping. A newly built temple was inaugurated on 23 November 2015.

MMRC & Unity Park 
MMRC Stands for Menjor Multi-Purpose Research Centre and is a multi-dimensional research centre established in 2010 and modelled for tourism and served as a recreation park.

See also 
 Thoubal district
 Meitei language
 Manipur
 Ikop Pat

References

External links 

 KanglaOnline
 E-pao
 Thoubal District

Geography of Manipur